Savarkar is a two part biography about Indian politician and writer Vinayak Damodar Savarkar, written by biographer Vikram Sampath and published by Penguin Viking. The first part is sub-titled Echoes from a Forgotten Past, 1883–1924 and the second part is A Contested Legacy, 1924-1966.

About
The series contains two books, the first volume talks about the life of Savarkar from the year 1883 to 1924. Whereas, the concluding volume is focused on the year 1924 to 1966.Sampath's research included Savarkar Samagra, interviewing Savarkar's family, visiting memorials, reading newspapers from the time and conducting research at associated libraries and institutions.

The first book covers Savarkar’s life from birth to his release in 1924. There are details about other Indian independence activists like Shyamji Krishna Verma and Virendranath Chattopadhyay. The book narrates Savarkar's atheism and rationalism, and his strong opposition to orthodox Hindu beliefs. Bal Gangadhar Tilak's recommendation helped get him a scholarship to London where he spent five years; in London he built a network of revolutionaries across Europe and helped provide the intellectual basis for the movement. Sampath reveals how revolutionaries like Bhagat Singh and Subhash Chandra Bose" considered Savarkar as a "figurehead of the revolution." It also describes how Savarkar was held in an immense esteem until his imprisonment in the Andaman and Nicobar Islands

The second book covers the later years of Savarkar, starting from 1924 to 1966. The book talks about events such as his social reform works in Ratnagiri after his release; his work with the Hindu Sangathans such as Hindu Mahasabha and the Rashtriya Swayamsevak Sangh (RSS) during the freedom movement, his desire for Hindu unity, his opposition to Gandhi’s non-violence, his implication and acquittal in Gandhi’s assassination and its overall impact on his contentious legacy.

Sampath has said that a motivation to write the book was that no comprehensive biography of Savarkar had been written since the 1960s, yet Savarkar was used in political discourse often, where the demand to give Savarkar a Bharat Ratna, India's highest civilian award, had even been brought up recently.

Reception 
Shiv Sena chief Uddhav Thackeray attended the book launch. TCA Srinivasa Raghavan, former Indian diplomat and current Director General of the Indian Council of World Affairs called it, a must read no-nonsense book over a review at Calcutta Telegraph.

In a review of the book at the Open Magazine, historian Manu S. Pillai praised Sampath's meticulous research and gathering of source materials to have aided in a definitive charting of his early years and noted of him to have persuasively laid out the case of Savarkar as a martyr who sacrificed his youth for the cause of the nation. However, Pillai sharply criticized the methodologies of his scholarship especially the uncritical acceptance of Savarkar's self-laudatory memoirs, some written years after the incidents. He rejected Sampath's acceptance of Savarkar's mercy petitions as a shrewd strategy that ran parallel to the plot by Shivaji, in that Savarkar stuck to his promises of absolute cooperation until his death and refused to be associated with acts of rebellion, anymore. Pillai also notes Sampath to have not achieved the necessary distance of separation, required for penning an objective non-eulogizing biography; he remained in Savarkar's awe for much of the spans.

Janaki Bakhle, an associate professor of Indian history at University of California, Berkeley, echoed concerns similar to Pillai. She praised Sampath's meticulous and thorough research but noted the work to be a wholly uncritical biography, with him doing very little to distance from the subject and accepting every primary source at face-value. His interpretation of concurrent historical events were also faulted as non-objective and lacking of the recent radical developments in relevant scholarship. P. A. Krishnan noted the work to be a sympathetic biography in a review over at Outlook.

Madhav Khosla, professor of Political Science at Ashoka University, called the book a "useful historical narrative".

Swati Parashar, a professor at the Gothenburg University, called the book "a must-read for all students of history and politics, for everyone else who wants to understand the angst of contemporary times"

References

Further reading 
 Syed Firdaus Ashraf (21 October 2019). Is BJP serious about Bharat Ratna for Savarkar? Rediff.

Vinayak Damodar Savarkar
Hindutva
Indian biographies